Recoletos is a Cercanías station in Madrid city center. It was opened in 1967 as part of the Túnel de la risa project and it is located between Atocha and Nuevos Ministerios stations.

Cercanías Madrid stations
Railway stations in Spain opened in 1967